Syrena, or FSO Syrena, was a Polish automobile model.

Syrena may also refer to:

 Syrena Rekord, a defunct Polish record label
 Syrena (Pirates of the Caribbean), a character from the 2011 film Pirates of the Caribbean: On Stranger Tides
 Syrena Tricksy, a character from the 1741 novel The Anti-Pamela; or, Feign'd Innocence Detected by Eliza Haywood

See also
 Sarina (disambiguation)
 Serena (disambiguation)
 Sirena (disambiguation)